Quilizumab (INN) is a humanized monoclonal antibody designed for the treatment of asthma. It binds to IGHE.

This drug was developed by Genentech.

References 

Monoclonal antibodies
Hoffmann-La Roche brands
Genentech brands